Hur (also spelled Chur) was a companion of Moses and Aaron in the Hebrew Bible. He was a member of the Tribe of Judah. His identity remains unclear in the Torah itself, but it is elaborated in rabbinical commentary.

Other individuals named Hur are also mentioned in the Bible.

Hur, companion of Moses
In the Book of Exodus, Hur is first mentioned as a companion of Moses and Aaron watching the Battle of Rephidim against the Amalekites. He aided Aaron to hold up the hands of Moses when Moses realised that the Israelites prevailed in battle while his hands were raised: "Aaron and Hur stayed up his hands, the one on the one side, and the other on the other side". He is mentioned once more as Moses' staunch ally when he is left in co-charge with Aaron of the Israelites when Moses was away on Mount Sinai. Moses told the people "Aaron and Hur are with you; whosoever hath a cause, let him come near unto them." However, only Aaron is mentioned in the later account of events during Moses' absence and the creation of the Golden Calf.

Hur is also mentioned as the grandfather of Bezalel, designated by God to be the principal creator of the Tabernacle and the Ark of the Covenant. Though it is not entirely certain that this Hur is the same individual, he has been treated as such in Jewish tradition.

In the Books of Chronicles Hur is either the son or the father of Caleb. The language is sufficiently ambiguous that different interpretations are possible. The King James Version of the Bible states, "These were the sons of Caleb the son of Hur, the firstborn of Ephratah; Shobal the father of Kirjathjearim...." The New International Version has "These were the sons of Caleb. The sons of Hur, the firstborn of Ephrathah, were Shobal the father of Kiriath-jearim...." The second version places Hur as the first child of Caleb by his second wife Ephrath.

Hur had four sons: Uri the father of Bezalel, and three others, Shobal, Salma and Hareph, who are said to have been the founders of the towns of Kirjath-jearim, Bethlehem, and Bethgader respectively. However, I Chronicles calls Hur himself the father of Bethlehem.

Rabbinical commentary

The Bible in Exodus 38:22 states explicitly Hur's descendants:  "And Bezalel son of Uri, son of Hur...",  but not directly his parental lineage, except that he was from the tribe of Judah.

According to Rabbinic tradition, Hur was the son of Miriam, thus Moses and Aaron's nephew. The Talmud (Sanhedrin 69b & Sotah 11b) states that Caleb, a descendant from Judah, married Miriam and fathered Hur. This is based on the Targum to I Chron.  2:19: "...and Caleb took for himself Ephrath and she bore him Hur". Ephrath was another name for Miriam. Rashi's Bible commentary justifies this position on the two other locations in Exodus where Hur is mentioned: 17:10 & 24:14. However, Josephus in Antiquities of the Jews states that Hur was the husband of Moses' sister Miriam.

In Talmudic tradition the sudden disappearance of Hur from the narrative of Exodus is explained by the claim that Hur was killed when he tried to prevent the making of the Golden Calf. The murder of Hur intimidated Aaron into complying with the popular demand to create the idol. Hur's faithfulness was rewarded by God by granting his grandson the role of making the Tabernacle.

Other Hurs
It is the traditional view that Hur the companion of Moses is the same as the grandfather of Bezalel, but this is not certain. Other persons named Hur include:

Hur, a King of the Midianites
He was killed with four other Midianite kings during the time of Moses by an Israelite expedition led by Phinehas, son of Eleazar. Balaam, son of Beor, was also slain by the Israelites in this expedition (Num. 31:8; Joshua 13:21).

Hur, the Father of Rephaiah
He is only mentioned in his relationship to Rephaiah (Nehemiah 3:9); there are no other biographical data regarding him. While it is possible it could refer to one of the other persons by the name of Hur (other than the King of Midian) if "Rephaiah the son of Hur" means Hur was an ancestor and not a biological father, it is extremely unlikely.

References

Book of Exodus people
Books of Chronicles people
Moses
Golden calf
Tribe of Judah